Devlet Hatun (1361 – 23 January 1414) was the wife of Sultan Bayezid I, and the mother of Mehmed I of the Ottoman Empire.

Biography
Devlet Hatun was the twelfth and last wife of Ottoman Sultan Bayezid I and the mother of Bayezid's successor, Mehmed I. Although the sign at her tomb says that Devlet was the daughter of a Germiyanid (i.e. Turkic) prince, she was ethnically of non-Turkish origin. Since both Devlet Hâtun and  Devletşah Hatun died in 1414, she is frequently confused with Devletşâh Hâtun, the daughter of Süleyman of Germiyan.
 
Devlet Hatun died on 23 January 1414 and was buried at the Devlet Hatun Tomb in Bursa.

See also
Ottoman Empire
Ottoman dynasty
Ottoman family tree
List of Valide Sultans
List of consorts of the Ottoman Sultans

References

 
14th-century consorts of Ottoman sultans
15th-century consorts of Ottoman sultans
1414 deaths